Oxford Township is one of the nineteen townships of Guernsey County, Ohio, United States. As of the 2010 census the population was 809, up from 677 people at the 2000 census. In 2010, 726 people lived in the unincorporated portion of the township.

Geography
Located in the eastern part of the county, it borders the following townships:
Londonderry Township - north
Kirkwood Township, Belmont County - northeast
Warren Township, Belmont County - southeast
Millwood Township - south
Wills Township - west
Madison Township - northwest

The village of Fairview is located in eastern Oxford Township.

Name and history
Oxford Township was organized in 1810. It is one of six Oxford Townships statewide.

Government
The township is governed by a three-member board of trustees, who are elected in November of odd-numbered years to a four-year term beginning on the following January 1. Two are elected in the year after the presidential election and one is elected in the year before it. There is also an elected township fiscal officer, who serves a four-year term beginning on April 1 of the year after the election, which is held in November of the year before the presidential election. Vacancies in the fiscal officership or on the board of trustees are filled by the remaining trustees.

References

External links
County website

Townships in Guernsey County, Ohio
Townships in Ohio